2-OH-NPA is a drug used in scientific research which acts as a potent and selective agonist for the dopamine D2 receptor.

References 

Dopamine agonists
Dibenzoquinolines
Catechols